Galva Township is a township in 
Ida County, Iowa, USA.

References

Ida County, Iowa
Townships in Iowa